The Kamalamba Navavarna Kritis by Shri Muthuswami Dikshitar (1776-1836) are some of the most famous pieces of music in the Carnatic system of Indian classical music. They are treasures which embody not only the technical brilliance of the composer but also offer a peep into the advaitic school of Hindu philosophy and elements of Tantric rituals. They are very elaborate compositions which may be well compared with major symphonies in the Western system.

Goddess Kamalamba

Kamalamba Navavarna Krithis is a group of compositions on Goddess Kamalamba enshrined in the Thyagarajeshwarar Temple, at Thiruvarur. She is enshrined in a separate shrine inside the temple. She holds an esteemed position as She is seen seated in a different posture altogether. She is seen in deep meditation, placing Her legs one above the other, in a Yogic state.

Kamalambike - Dhyana Krithi

This song is the invocatory song for the whole set of krithis. This song is composed in Thodi ragam and set to Rupaka thalam.

Pallavi
 
kamalambike Ashrita kalpalatikE chanDike
kamaniyArunAm Suke
karavidhruta Suke mAmava

Anupallavi

kamalAsanAdi pujita kamalapade bahuvarade
kamalAlaya tirTha vaiBhave karunArnave

Charanam

sakala loka nAyikE sangIta rasikE
suKhavitva pradAyikE sundari gata mAyikE
vikaLEbarA mukti dAna nipuNe aGhaharanE
viyadAdi Bhuta kiraNE vinOda caraNE aruNE

sakaLE guruguha karaNE sadASivanthah karaNE
akacatathapadi varNE aKhanda Ika rasa purNE

References

External links
 Guruguha.org https://web.archive.org/web/20160304045424/http://guruguha.org/wiki/kamalambike.html

Carnatic compositions